Indian served the following destinations before being merged into Air India on 26 February 2011:

Asia

South Asia
India
Andaman and Nicobar Islands
Port Blair - Vir Savarkar Airport
Andhra Pradesh
Tirupati - Tirupati Airport
Visakhapatnam - Visakhapatnam Airport
Vijayawada - Vijayawada Airport
Assam
Dibrugarh - Mohanbari Airport
Guwahati - Lokpriya Gopinath Bordoloi International Airport
Silchar - Kumbhirgram Airport
Bihar
Gaya - Gaya Airport
Patna - Lok Nayak Jayaprakash Airport
Chandigarh
Chandigarh Airport
Chhattisgarh
Raipur - Mana Airport
Delhi
Indira Gandhi International Airport Hub
Goa
Vasco da Gama - Dabolim Airport
Gujarat
Ahmedabad - Sardar Vallabhbhai Patel International Airport
Jamnagar - Jamnagar Airport
Rajkot - Rajkot Airport
Jammu and Kashmir
Jammu - Satwari Airport
Leh - Kushok Bakula Rimpochee Airport
Srinagar - Sheikh ul Alam Airport
Jharkhand
Ranchi - Birsa Munda Airport
Karnataka
Bangalore - Bengaluru International Airport
Mangalore - Mangalore International Airport
Kerala
Kochi - Cochin International Airport
Kozhikode - Calicut International Airport
Thiruvananthapuram - Trivandrum International Airport
Madhya Pradesh
Bhopal - Raja Bhoj Airport
Indore - Devi Ahilyabai Holkar Airport
Khajuraho - Khajuraho Airport
Maharashtra
Aurangabad - Chikkalthana Airport
Mumbai - Chhatrapati Shivaji International Airport Hub
Nagpur - Dr. Babasaheb Ambedkar International Airport
Pune - Pune International Airport
Manipur
Imphal - Imphal Airport
Mizoram
Aizawl - Lengpui Airport
Nagaland
Dimapur - Dimapur Airport
Orissa
Bhubaneswar - Biju Patnaik Airport
Punjab
Amritsar - Sri Guru Ram Dass Jee International Airport
Rajasthan
Jaipur - Sanganer Airport
Jodhpur - Jodhpur Airport
Udaipur - Maharana Pratap Airport
Tamil Nadu
Chennai - Anna International Airport
Coimbatore - Peelamedu Airport
Madurai - Madurai Airport
Telangana
Hyderabad - Rajiv Gandhi International Airport
Tripura
Agartala - Singerbhil Airport
Uttarakhand
Dehradun - Jolly Grant Airport
Uttar Pradesh
Lucknow - Amausi International Airport
Varanasi - Babatpur Airport
West Bengal
Kolkata - Netaji Subhash Chandra Bose International Airport
Bagdogra - Bagdogra Airport
Maldives
Malé - Malé International Airport
Nepal
Kathmandu - Tribhuvan International Airport

Southeast Asia
Burma
Yangon - Yangon International Airport

West Asia
Afghanistan
Kabul - Kabul International Airport
Kuwait
Kuwait International Airport
Oman
Muscat - Muscat International Airport
United Arab Emirates
Dubai - Dubai International Airport
Sharjah - Sharjah International Airport

Terminated destinations
Indian had served these countries/cities previously, most of which were suspended much before or during the merger process.

Asia
South Asia
Bangladesh - Chittagong, Dhaka
Pakistan - Karachi, Lahore
Sri Lanka - Colombo
Southeast Asia
Malaysia - Kuala Lumpur
Singapore - Singapore
Thailand - Bangkok
Southwest Asia
Bahrain - Manama 
Qatar - Doha
United Arab Emirates - Abu Dhabi, Fujairah, Ras al Khaimah

See also
Air India
Air India Regional

References

Lists of airline destinations
Destinations